The following is a list of fixtures and results of the Philippines women's national volleyball team against other national teams as well as foreign club sides.

Fixtures and results

1962

<small>
 - The first and last Women's Nine-a-side volleyball event at the 1962 Asian Games

1974

1997

2001

2003

2005

2006

2013

2015

2017

2018

2019

2022

Exhibition and tune up games results

See also
2021 Asian Women's Club Volleyball Championship – tournament where the national team participated as club teams.

References

Volleyball in the Philippines
Volleyball records and statistics